Mill Stone Branch is a stream in Oregon County in the Ozarks of southern Missouri. It is a tributary of Warm Fork Spring River.

Mill Stone Branch was so named on account of deposits of stone near its course which was used to fashion millstones.

See also
List of rivers of Missouri

References

Rivers of Oregon County, Missouri
Rivers of Missouri